Alpharetta is a city in northern Fulton County, Georgia, United States, and is a part of the Atlanta metropolitan area. As of the 2020 US Census, Alpharetta's population was 65,818; in 2010, the population was 57,551.

History

In the 1830s, the Cherokee people in Georgia and elsewhere in the South were forcibly relocated to the Indian Territory (present-day Oklahoma) under the Indian Removal Act. Pioneers and farmers later settled on the newly vacated land, situated along a former Cherokee trail stretching from the North Georgia mountains to the Chattahoochee River.

One of the area's first permanent landmarks was the New Prospect Camp Ground (also known as the Methodist Camp Ground), beside a natural spring near what is now downtown Alpharetta. It later served as a trading post for the exchanging of goods among settlers.

Known as the town of Milton through July 1858, the city of Alpharetta was chartered on December 11, 1858, with boundaries extending in a  radius from the city courthouse. It served as the county seat of Milton County until 1931, when Milton County merged with Fulton County to avoid bankruptcy during the Great Depression.

The city's name may be a variation of a fictional Indian girl, Alfarata, in the 19th-century song "The Blue Juniata"; it may also be derived from alpha, the first letter of the Greek alphabet.

The Simeon and Jane Rucker Log House, built in 1833, was listed on the National Register of Historic Places in 1997.

Geography

Alpharetta is in northern Fulton County and is bordered to the southeast by Johns Creek, to the south and west by Roswell, to the north by Milton, and to the northeast by unincorporated land in Forsyth County.

Climate
Alpharetta has a humid subtropical climate (Köppen climate classification Cfa) and is part of USDA hardiness zone 7b.

Demographics

2020 census

As of the 2020 United States census, there were 65,818 people, 25,391 households, and 18,167 families residing in the city.

2010 census
According to the 2010 census, the racial composition of the city of Alpharetta was as follows:

 White: 72.0%
 Asian: 13.7%
 Black or African American: 11.2%
 Hispanic or Latino : 8.7%
 Other: 2.9%
 Two or more races: 2.8%
 Native American: 0.2%
 Native Hawaiian and Other Pacific Islander: 0.1%

There were 13,911 households, out of which 36.2% had children under the age of 18 living with them, 54.1% were married couples living together, 7.3% had a female householder with no husband present, and 35.9% were non-families. 27.7% of all households were made up of individuals, and 4.2% had someone living alone who was 65 or older.
The average household size was 2.50 and the average family size was 3.13.

In the city, 27.0% of the population was under the age of 18, 7.2% from 18 to 24, 40.5% from 25 to 44, 19.4% from 45 to 64, and 5.8% who were 65 years of age or older. The median age was 33. For every 100 females, there were 98.3 males. For every 100 females age 18 and over, there were 94.9 males.

The median income for a household in the city was $95,888, and the median income for a family was $111,918. The per capita income for the city was $42,431. Males had a median income of $79,275 versus $59,935 for females. About 2.9% of families and 1.2% of the population were below the poverty line, including 0.3% of those under age 18 and 0.6% of those age 65 or over.

2000 census
As of the census of 2000, there were 34,854 people, 13,911 households, and 8,916 families residing in the city. The population has been gradually increasing over the last decade. During the workday, the city swells to more than 120,000 residents, workers, and visitors, due to the more than 3,600 businesses that are located in the city.

Economy

Top employers
According to the City's 2022 Annual Comprehensive Financial Report, the city's top private sector employers are:

Retail and mixed-use complexes
Complexes in the area include:
North Point Mall, a traditional mall set for redevelopment
An  mixed-use development, Avalon, opened in 2014. 
The Halcyon mixed residential-retail-entertainment-dining complex opened in 2019 in nearby Forsyth County has an Alpharetta postal address, but in not within the city limits or in the same county.

Tech Alpharetta
Tech Alpharetta (formerly known as the Alpharetta Technology Commission or simply ATC) is an advisory organization established by the City of Alpharetta in 2012. The organization is an independent, 501(c)(6) nonprofit organization that aims to help Alpharetta lead in technology innovation. Tech Alpharetta runs an advisory board of technology companies based in the city, holds monthly technology events for technology executives, and operates the Tech Alpharetta Innovation Center, a technology startup incubator. As of early 2020 about ten companies have "graduated" from Tech Alpharetta's incubator and were hiring employees in the North Fulton County region.

Major companies

Cynergy Data is headquartered in Alpharetta, as was NetBank when it existed.

Government 
Alpharetta is governed by a city council composed of six members and a mayor. The mayor and council members serve staggered four-year terms.

Mayor
 Jim Gilvin, 2018–present

Transportation

Major highways
 State Route 9
 State Route 120
 State Route 140
 State Route 372
 State Route 400
 U.S. Route 19

Pedestrians and cycling
There are plans for the creation of the Alpha Loop. The multi-use path will serve to connect residents of Alpharetta to activity centers, parks, and jobs by a network of multi-use trails providing safe alternatives to driving and offering recreational benefit.
The Big Creek Greenway is a concrete multi-use trail that runs from Windward Parkway to Mansell Road. The concrete trail is approximately 8 miles and meanders along Big Creek parallel to North Point Parkway, from Windward Parkway at Marconi Drive on the north end to Mansell Road on the south end. A soft mulch trail encircles a large wetland between Haynes Bridge Road and Mansell Road. Wildlife such as blue heron, deer, ducks and Canada geese can be observed in this preserved water setting. Future plans are to connect the trail to Cumming.

Mass transit
Alpharetta is not directly served by MARTA trains, but is by multiple bus routes. Currently, there have only been plans to connect Alpharetta to the rest of Metro Atlanta via heavy rail.

Attractions and events

The Downtown Alpharetta Welcome Center is at 178 South Main Street and has more than 200 complimentary brochures providing information on the surrounding area. The center is open Monday to Friday from 9 a.m. to 5 p.m., and a Virtual Information Kiosk is available on Saturdays from 10 a.m. to 4 p.m.

The Alpharetta Family Skate Center (aka The Cooler) is at 10800 Davis Drive. It is also home to the Atlanta Sparks special needs hockey team.

The Alpharetta Brew Moon Fest is held the first Saturday in October in downtown Alpharetta.

The Scarecrow Harvest is held the first Saturday in October in downtown Alpharetta. The streets are lined with 100 scarecrows to celebrate its fall spirit.

The Alpharetta Arboretum at Wills Park was established in September 2008 and includes 26 trees. A brochure about the arboretum guides readers through a walking tour of the trees and is available at the Downtown Alpharetta Welcome Center.

The Alpharetta Arboretum at Cogburn Road Park was established in December 2008 and showcases seven trees. A complimentary brochure for the arboretum is available at the Downtown Alpharetta Welcome Center and provides a starting point for a self-guided walking tour.

The Alpharetta Farmers Market is a weekly farmers' market in the downtown area that opens every Saturday from 8 AM to 12:30 PM from April to October, and features farmers and gardeners from the surrounding area selling fresh vegetables, flowers, and edible goods such as jam. The market was named "Best Saturday Morning Excursion" in 2007 by Atlanta magazine.

The Downtown Alpharetta Historic District is in the center of Alpharetta at the intersection of North Main Street, South Main Street, Milton Avenue, and Academy Street. Around this area are several historic buildings from the late 19th century and earlier. The downtown area has been restored, replacing more modern buildings with period structures, and includes dining, shopping, and widened brick sidewalks.

The Mansell House and Gardens is a 1912 Queen Anne style home that serves as a special event facility in Alpharetta. It also serves as home to the Alpharetta Historical Society.

The Milton Log Cabin was built by Future Farmers of America students during the 1934–35 school year and resembles life during the late 19th century.

Ameris Bank Amphitheatre is a 12,000-capacity outdoor venue that serves as the summer home of the Grammy Award-winning Atlanta Symphony Orchestra and hosta acts like the Dave Matthews Band, Rod Stewart, Steve Miller Band and the Eagles.

North Point Community Church is based in Alpharetta. It is the main campus of North Point Ministries, the nation's largest church organization, run by evangelical preacher Andy Stanley. The campus welcomes more than 5,000 people every Sunday.

The Alpharetta Symphony Orchestra (AlphaSO) is an orchestra based in Alpharetta.

The Walk of Memories is at American Legion Post 201 and pays tribute to veterans of the U.S. Armed Forces, community and friends, through a brick walk inscribed with the names of all Georgia residents killed in service during and after World War II. A separate section is reserved for those who served in the military and survived. A tank and helicopter are on display.

The path includes additional mountain bike trails.

The Taste of Alpharetta is an annual food festival featuring food from local restaurants, live music, and art exhibits.

The Wire and Wood Alpharetta Songwriters Festival in downtown Alpharetta is held in October.

Avalon is a multi-use development on the east side of downtown adjacent to State Route 400. It includes  of retail space, a 12-screen Regal Cinemas theater,  of office space over retail, 101 single-family residences and 250 luxury rental homes.

The Alpharetta Bulls Rugby Football Club is a Men's Division 3 Rugby Team competing in the Georgia Rugby Union and USA Rugby competitions.

Education

Primary and secondary schools
The city is served by Fulton County Schools.

Elementary schools (Grades K-5)
 Abbotts Hill Elementary School
 Alpharetta Elementary School
 Birmingham Falls Elementary School in Milton
 Cogburn Woods Elementary School in Milton
 Crabapple Crossing Elementary School in Milton
 Creek View Elementary School
 F.A.S.T. k-8
 Hembree Springs Elementary School in Roswell
 Lake Windward Elementary School
 Manning Oaks Elementary School
 Mimosa Elementary School in Roswell
 New Prospect Elementary School
 Ocee Elementary School in Johns Creek
 Summit Hill Elementary School in Milton

Middle schools (Grades 6-8)
 Autrey Mill Middle School in Johns Creek
 Elkins Pointe Middle School in Roswell
 Haynes Bridge Middle School
 Holcomb Bridge Middle School
 Hopewell Middle School in Milton
 Northwestern Middle School in Milton
 Taylor Road Middle School in Johns Creek
 Webb Bridge Middle School
 Amana Academy, a public charter school in Alpharetta for students in Kindergarten to 8th grade
 Fulton Science Academy (FSA), a private school in Roswell for students in 6th to 8th grade

High schools (Grades 9-12)
 Alpharetta High School serves most of Alpharetta
Cambridge High School in Milton
 Centennial High School in Roswell
 Chattahoochee High School in Johns Creek
 Johns Creek High School in Johns Creek
 Milton High School in Milton
 Northview High School
 Roswell High School in Roswell
 Independence High School, an alternative school on the old Milton High School campus.
 Fulton Science Academy High School (formerly T. E. A. C. H.), a public charter school in Alpharetta for students in 9th to 12th grade.

Private schools
 The Lionheart School
 St. Francis Schools
 Mount Pisgah Christian School

The Roman Catholic Archdiocese of Atlanta operates Holy Redeemer Catholic School (K-8) in Johns Creek; the school's address is often said to be in "Alpharetta, GA".

Higher education
Georgia State University, Gwinnett Technical College and Reinhardt University have campuses in Alpharetta.

Music Education

 Alpharetta Symphony Youth Orchestra

Public libraries
Atlanta-Fulton Public Library System operates the Alpharetta Branch.

Notable people

Auzoyah Alufohai, football player, Kennesaw State University (2014–2018), University of West Georgia (2019), and current NFL free agent 

Devontae Cacok, basketball player, University of North Carolina Wilmington (2015–2019) and San Antonio Spurs (2021–present)

Joshua Dobbs (Professional football player, born Jan. 26, 1995) Quarterback for the University of Tennessee and Tennessee Titans

Anthony Fisher (basketball, born 1986) (born 1986), basketball player in the Israeli Basketball Premier League

Jaycee Horn, Professional Football player for the Carolina Panthers

Ariana Savalas, performer

Lisa Wu, actress and former cast member of The Real Housewives of Atlanta

C. J. Abrams, shortstop for the San Diego Padres

Brandon Beach, American politician serving as a member of the Georgia State Senate

Malik Beasley, American professional basketball player and member of the Minnesota Timberwolves

Jaron Blossomgame, American professional basketball player for ratiopharm Ulm of the Basketball Bundesliga

Clint Boling, American football guard who spent his entire eight-year career with the Cincinnati Bengals of the National Football League (NFL)

Trey Britton, American professional basketball player

Bobbi Kristina Brown, reality television star, musician, and daughter of Whitney Houston and Bobby Brown, lived and was found unconscious in her Alpharetta home leading to her death.

Lee Chapple, American football quarterback for the Atlanta Havoc of the American Arena League (AAL)

CJ Cochran, American professional soccer player who plays as a goalkeeper for the Tampa Bay Rowdies in the USL Championship

Kaiser Gates, American professional basketball player for Hapoel Jerusalem of the Israeli Basketball Premier League

Cullen Harper, former American football quarterback

Peyton Barber, American football running back

Marjorie Taylor Greene, American politician and businesswoman

Courtney Jaye, American singer and songwriter

Carl Lawson (American football), American football defensive end for the New York Jets of the National Football League (NFL)

Brandon Leibrandt, American professional baseball pitcher in the Chicago Cubs organization

Madison Lintz, American actress known for her roles as Sophia Peletier in the AMC (TV channel) post-apocalyptic television drama series The Walking Dead (TV series) and as Madeline "Maddie" Bosch in the Amazon (company) series Bosch (TV series) and its spin-off Bosch: Legacy 

Ken Flach, American doubles world No. 1 tennis player

Jack McInerney, American soccer player

Riley Puckett, American country music pioneer, best known as a member of Gid Tanner and the Skillet Lickers

James Ramsey (baseball), American college baseball coach and former professional baseball outfielder

Ryann Redmond, American actress and singer known for originating the role of Bridget in Bring It On: The Musical

Alex Ross (American football), American professional gridiron football quarterback who is currently a free agent

Ryan Roushandel, American soccer player and coach

Tyler Ruthven, former American soccer player

Marcus Sayles, professional gridiron football defensive back for the BC Lions of the Canadian Football League (CFL)

Shannon Scott, American professional basketball player for Brose Bamberg of the Basketball Bundesliga (BBL)

Heath Slocum, American professional golfer who currently plays on the PGA Tour

Tanner Smith (basketball), American professional basketball player and coach

Andy Stanley, founder and senior pastor of North Point Ministries

Maria Taylor (sportscaster), American sportscaster for NBC Sports

Ty Toney, American professional basketball player

Justin Tuggle, American Canadian football linebacker for the Toronto Argonauts of the Canadian Football League (CFL)

Charlie Whitehurst, former American football quarterback who played college football at the Clemson Tigers, and was drafted by the San Diego Chargers in the third round (81st overall) of the 2006 NFL Draft

References

External links

 Alpharetta Convention & Visitors Bureau home page

Cities in the Atlanta metropolitan area
Cities in Georgia (U.S. state)
Cities in Fulton County, Georgia
Former county seats in Georgia (U.S. state)
Populated places established in 1858
1858 establishments in Georgia (U.S. state)